Betula grossa, commonly known as Japanese cherry birch (Japanese: 梓 azusa), is a species of birch native to Japan, where it grows naturally in mixed woodland on hill and mountain slopes in Honshu, Shikoku , and Kyushu. It was introduced to the West in 1896, but remains rare in cultivation.

Description

Betula grossa is conical in outline, but its most distinctive feature is its cherry-like bark, with horizontal stripes of reddish-grey becoming dark grey with age, exfoliating in thin papery curls. The dark green leaves are up to 10 cm long and turn golden-yellow in autumn. The shoots are aromatic, and carry long, yellow-brown, male catkins in early spring. . The species is considered closely related to the American birch Betula lenta. Hardiness: RHS H4.

References

Flora of Japan
grossa
Taxa named by Joseph Gerhard Zuccarini